Árido Movie is a 2005 Brazilian drama film written and directed by . It premiered in the Horizons section at the 62nd edition of the Venice Film Festival. Released in Brazil in 2006, it was   nominated for Best Film at the 2007 Grande Prêmio do Cinema Brasileiro.

Plot

Cast   
  
 Guilherme Weber as Jonas
 Giulia Gam  as  Soledad
 Gustavo Falcão as  Falcão
 Selton Mello  as  Bob
 Mariana Lima as  Vera
 José Dumont as  Zé Elétrico
 Suyane Moreira as Wedja
 Luiz Carlos Vasconcelos  as Jurandir
 Aramis Trindade as  Márcio Greyck
 Matheus Nachtergaele  as Salustiano
 Maria de Jesus Bacarelli  as  Dona Carmo
 Renata Sorrah as  Stela

References

External links  

 

2005 drama films
2005 films
Brazilian drama films
2000s Portuguese-language films